Veronica Mars is the fictional protagonist, occasional narrator (through voice-overs), and antiheroine of the American television series Veronica Mars, which aired on UPN from 2004 to 2006 and on The CW from 2006 to 2007. The character was portrayed by Kristen Bell through the duration of the series. Following the show's cancellation, Bell reprised the role in the 2014 film continuation. The character, created by Rob Thomas, was originally male and the protagonist of his unproduced novel Untitled Rob Thomas Teen Detective Novel, which eventually became the basis of the series. After the work's transition from novel to television series, Thomas changed the character's gender from male to female because he believed that a noir piece told from a female point of view would be more interesting.

Before the show starts, Veronica's best friend, Lilly Kane, has been murdered, and her father, Keith Mars, has lost not only his position of sheriff in the fictional town of Neptune, California, but also his reputation, status, and wife. The series begins with Veronica at the bottom of her posh high school's pecking order, having lost her popular status and popular friends because her father accused her boyfriend's father of involvement in the murder.

Character history

Background and details of plot 
At the beginning of the series, Veronica is a 17-year-old junior at Neptune High in her the fictional town of Neptune, California, which is someplace near San Diego. According to series creator Rob Thomas, Veronica's birthday is in August. After (and sometimes before) school, Veronica works for her father, private investigator Keith Mars, the former sheriff of Balboa County, California. Veronica has few friends until she meets and helps Wallace Fennel, who becomes her best friend.

Back-story to season one 
Veronica's story is told via voice-overs and flashbacks fitted into the main story. The year before the series picks up, Veronica was part of the in-crowd at Neptune High. Her best friend was popular junior Lilly Kane. Veronica was dating Lilly's brother, Duncan Kane and Lilly was dating Logan Echolls, Duncan's good friend. The four were at the forefront of the school's wealthy and popular "09er" clique (named after the 90909 zip code, a wealthy area of Neptune) that dominated Neptune High's social scene. Though Veronica did not meet the economic status of the other 09ers, she was accepted into the clique because she was dating Duncan, and because of her father's influence as sheriff.

Duncan broke up with Veronica and stopped talking to her with no explanation. Lilly refused to explain to Veronica what went wrong. Shortly afterwards, Lilly was found murdered at the side of her family's pool. Sheriff Keith Mars accused Lilly's father, Neptune beloved software entrepreneur Jake Kane, of involvement in the murder. The citizens of Neptune were horrified, and Keith quickly found himself voted out of office and turned into a pariah by the wealthy 09er community. Keith's credibility took another blow when his replacement as Sheriff, former Deputy Sheriff Don Lamb, arrested disgruntled former Kane Software employee Abel Koontz, who confessed to Lilly's murder.

The shock and loss of income destroyed the Mars family. Veronica's mother started drinking heavily and abandoned the family several months later.

Veronica sealed her fate as an outsider when she refused to denounce her father. Duncan stopped speaking to Veronica, and the rest of the 09ers followed suit. Veronica found herself banished from the exclusive 09er social scene and friends.

Two months after Lilly's death, Veronica crashed an 09er party, thrown by Shelley Pomroy, to prove to her ex-friends that she did not care what they said about her. At the party, Veronica's drink is spiked with GHB and she awakens the next morning in a guest bedroom without any recollection of the night before and without any underwear. To her horror, she realizes she was raped. When she reports the crime to Sheriff Lamb, he calls her a liar and throws her out of his office.

These events change Veronica. She became cynical, filled with contempt and disgust towards her classmates and Neptune's wealthy elite. A pariah like her father, she funneled her time and energy into helping him in his own detective agency. But when a chance encounter with new transfer student Wallace Fennel led to her gaining a new friend, she began to use her investigation talents to help her fellow students and to go head-to-head with the 09'ers.

Veronica slowly begins to outgrow her cynicism, with the help of new friends Wallace Fennel, Cindy "Mac" Mackenzie, and Meg Manning.

Prior to Lilly's death Veronica is portrayed as carefree, girly, sweet and young, with long hair. It is suggested that Veronica cut her hair because it reminded her too much of Lilly. The transition to a sharp-witted, cynical, edgy outcast was quick.

Detective 
After being ousted from the Sheriff's Department, Keith Mars opens Mars Investigations, a PI agency, Veronica gains an after-school job as his secretary. Though she is often forbidden from handling certain cases, she often oversteps her boundaries and sometimes even completely solves the case before her father. She is also an unofficial private investigator for Neptune High tracking down computer hackers, digging up dirt on parents, finding out who stole the school's mascot, and the like. She keeps one step ahead of her father and Vice-Principal Van Clemmons through the occasional help of her best friend Wallace — Watson to her Holmes — and classmate Eli "Weevil" Navarro, the leader of the PCH Biker Gang.

Logan Echolls (Jason Dohring), once a close friend, had helped organize the blacklisting of Veronica from the 09er clique. The two crossed swords on several occasions before Logan sought Veronica's help in finding out if his mother, Lynn, might have faked her death when she jumped into the ocean. Still reeling from the abandonment of her own mother, Veronica empathized with Logan's pain, and the two reconciled most of their differences. Towards the end of the third season of the series, Veronica successfully completes her California state examination to receive her official license as a detective in her own right. Veronica scored a 95 on her private investigator test.

Some years later, Veronica is shown to have moved on from her old life as a detective and has a job offer from a prestigious law firm in New York. However, when Logan is accused of murder, Veronica returns to Neptune to clear his name, eventually deciding to stay in Neptune to fight the local corruption and classism that has developed there since her departure.

Romantic relationships

Duncan Kane 

Veronica dated Duncan Kane until approximately September 2005. Both Veronica's mother Lianne Mars and Duncan's mother Celeste Kane were against their relationship, though Veronica did not find out why until much later. Some time prior to Lilly's death, Celeste revealed to Duncan that his father, Jake, had had an affair with Lianne, and that Veronica might be his half-sister. Duncan broke up with Veronica because of this, but did not explain his reasons for doing so. Keith Mars later had a paternity test which proved that he is her father, not Jake Kane.

Veronica did not speak to Duncan until well into her Junior year. A few episodes after the series starts, Duncan and Veronica start being friendly towards each other, eventually even becoming friends. That comes to an end when Veronica believes Duncan raped her and confronts him about it. The issue was eventually resolved when the fact that both parties were under the influence of GHB came to light.

In the summer between the first and second seasons Veronica and Duncan got back together on her 18th birthday. They stayed together until roughly the middle of the second season. Unbeknownst to Duncan, his previous girlfriend Meg Manning was pregnant before they broke up. Meg was on the bus that crashed at the beginning of the season, but survived comatose. She later died of a blood clot shortly after coming out of a coma. Their daughter was born just before she died. In order to prevent Meg's abusive parents from getting custody of his baby, Duncan decided to kidnap her and run away. Veronica helps him to do so and knowing that they can never speak to or see each other again, the two of them share a tearful farewell. Duncan does not appear again the series except for a brief cameo at the end of season 2 where he is now living in Australia and is at the beach with his daughter when his phone rings. He answers it, saying "CW?" (a joke about the show being moved to the then new network CW) and it's Clarence Weidman on the other end, who says "It's a done deal." in reference to the killing of Aaron Echolls, suggesting that Duncan was the one who arranged it as revenge for Aaron being acquitted over Lilly's murder.

Troy Vandegraff 

Troy Vandegraff was a childhood friend of Duncan Kane who attended Neptune High for a short period early in the first season. Despite the bad rumors about Veronica circulating around the school, Troy took a liking to her. Veronica was reluctant to date him at first, but warmed to him when she realized his good intentions toward her. In the fifth episode though, Troy deceives her into helping him escape being sent to boarding school so he can run away with an old girlfriend. Veronica realizes his plan and double-crosses him.

Veronica does not meet Troy again until the second season episode "The Rapes of Graff" when they both go to visit Hearst College. Though she is at first cold toward him, Troy insists that he's changed. He also tells her that his feelings toward her were real when they dated and apologizes for how he treated her. When he is suspected of raping a student and shaving her head after a party, Veronica helps to prove his innocence and they part amicably.

Leo D'Amato 

Leo D’Amato (Max Greenfield) is a deputy at the Neptune Sheriff Department whom Veronica dated for a short time in the middle of the first season. At first, Veronica merely went to him for help in getting access to classified evidence or files in the police station, but she soon fell for him. Veronica broke up with Leo after she and Logan Echolls kissed and she didn't want to keep dating Leo while she figured out her feelings.

Many years later, in the fourth season, Leo returns as an FBI agent tied to the case which Veronica is working. They resume their friendship and although there is still chemistry, the flirtation between the characters ultimately seals Veronica's resolve to be with Logan.

Logan Echolls 

Veronica began to date Logan Echolls at the end of the first season. While she was going out with Leo D’Amato, she kissed Logan in thanks for saving her from a would-be kidnapper (Jonathan Taylor Thomas), who actually turned out to be an ATF agent. Their kiss turned into something more when Logan pulled her into a passionate embrace. They begin to secretly date.

Their relationship quickly ran into trouble when it was revealed Logan was the one who supplied the GHB that would eventually lead to Veronica being drugged and raped at Shelly Pomroy's party. For a time, Veronica even suspected that Logan was her rapist. When she discovered that he wasn’t, she resolved everything with him. Their relationship was revealed to Logan's 09er friends at a party. At the same party, Veronica discovered cameras trained on the bed in Logan's pool house and flees. Soon after, Veronica found out that Logan had no alibi the day Lilly was murdered and feared that he had killed her.

Veronica found out that the cameras in the pool house had been set up by Logan's father, Aaron Echolls, and discovered that he was the one who killed Lilly after she stole the tapes, he made of them having sex. The night Aaron was arrested for Lilly's murder, Logan turned up at Veronica's house, after having been severely beaten by the PCHers. Veronica stood by him when he was accused of murdering one of them, Felix Toombs. Though he was acquitted, Logan's behavior became erratic over that summer, because of his trial and because of the revelation that his father had been having an affair with Lilly and had killed her.

He and the 09ers began a vicious turf war with the PCHers. Veronica breaks up with Logan soon after, telling him that he was out of control and that he enjoyed participating in the violence too much.

Late in the season though, he drunkenly revealed to Veronica that he still had deep feelings for her and thought that their love was ‘epic. Veronica visits him the next morning to tell him that she felt the same, only to find out that he had no memory of what he’d said and had slept with old flame Kendall Casablancas the night before. But during her stand-off with Cassidy Casablancas, on the roof of the Neptune Grand, it was Logan that Veronica phoned for help. Logan tackled Cassidy to stop him from shooting Veronica. He then talked Veronica out of shooting Cassidy and comforts her when she thinks her father was blown-up on Woody Goodman's plane.

Afterwards, they resume their relationship and become closer over the summer. At the beginning of the third season, they begin attending Hearst College. Their relationship is as heated and loving as before, but Veronica has developed severe trust issues over the last few years. She constantly struggles against her instincts to track him and verify everything he says and does, while Logan resents the expectations, she places on him and her inability to admit that she might be wrong. Though she spurns him when he reveals that he and Mercer left a motel in Tijuana in flames without helping people to escape, she realizes her feelings for him when he comes to her aid after she is drugged and attacked by the Hearst rapist.

Unable to deal with Veronica being in constant danger, Logan tries to convince her to drop her investigation into the rapes and even has a bodyguard tail her without her knowledge, infuriating Veronica when she finds out. Though they fight out their problems and both admit that they love one another, Logan breaks up with Veronica in the ninth episode. He says that they can both see that they aren’t working out because neither of them can change their ways (Veronica with her trust issues and Logan with his need to protect her despite her wishes) and that he would rather a little pain now than a lot later. He tells her he will always be there for her. Veronica is deeply upset and breaks down when she gets home. Although Logan tries to help Veronica find out who the rapist is, he is still elsewhere when she is attacked by Mercer and Moe. When he learns that Mercer was the one who attacked Veronica, he purposely gets himself arrested so he can be in the same cell as him — for revenge.

They spent the next six weeks apart. During the break-up, Dick tried to help Logan move on by bringing him to the beach, later meeting up with a group of girls. Later, Veronica showed up at Logan's place and they shared a passionate kiss, realizing that they had missed each other, and became a couple again. In the next episode, Logan told Veronica that he had hooked up with someone else who "meant less than nothing to him" over their 6-week break, but didn't elaborate on who it was. It turns out that Logan had slept with Madison Sinclair in Aspen, which Veronica considered one of the worst insults (though Logan didn't know this). This time, sexual jealousy and an unwillingness to forgive and forget ends their relationship.

Logan moved on to Parker Lee, while Veronica did the same with Stosh "Piz" Piznarski. Veronica vows never to speak to Logan again after he violently beats up Piz, believing Piz emailed a racy video of himself and Veronica all over Hearst. However, the series ended with Logan and Veronica sharing one last ambiguous look, leaving their relationship unresolved.

Although they haven't seen each other in nine years, the characters reconnect in the Veronica Mars film, in which Veronica helps Logan who is accused of murder. They continue their relationship and Logan vows to return to Veronica after his Navy deployment. This relationship is continued into the fourth season which has a side plot revolving around Logan's marriage proposal to Veronica, her rejection then acceptance of it, and finally their wedding. As the series' final twist the Neptune Bomber's last explosion is a bomb left in their car which kills Logan, just before they are heading off on their honeymoon.

Stosh "Piz" Piznarski 
Veronica met Piz on her first day at Hearst College when Wallace (who is Piz's roommate) requested her help to find Piz's missing things in 'Welcome Wagon." When they first meet, Piz seems momentarily stunned by Veronica, and develops a crush on her, which she doesn't return at the time as she is going out with Logan Echolls. Although she ignored his romantic feelings, a steady friendship developed between them. Veronica shared her thoughts with him about her problems with Logan, and after Piz unknowingly gave her the advice she needed, Veronica and Logan reunited (much to Piz's internal disappointment).

Piz and Veronica seem quite happy together, and stand by each other when a racy video of them is emailed around Hearst. When Logan attacks Piz after jumping to the conclusion that Piz made the video, Veronica vows never to speak to him again, and Logan's new girlfriend, Parker, breaks up with him because she realizes that he still has feelings for Veronica. After finding out who sent the video, Piz and Veronica are eating lunch when the culprit walks in. Veronica threatens him but he is unapologetic, taunting her about what he can do. Piz holds Veronica back, advising her to drop it and walk away. She reluctantly obeys. The next day Veronica is approached by the student who bugged Piz's dorm room. He is very insulting to Veronica, who ignores it and warns Logan that the boy is connected to the Mafia. Logan remarks that he wondered why Veronica was so forgiving and then beats the culprit up with much passion (as he does not have anything left to lose). When the student, lying on the floor, threatens "whoever you are, you're going to die," Logan answers flippantly "yeah, someday," then shares a look with Veronica who gives a hint of a smile. Logan then apologizes to Piz for attacking him, as Veronica earlier advised him to do, and leaves the scene without turning back, with Veronica still staring at him. Piz's eyes go from Veronica to Logan, and to Veronica again. Sighing, he expresses a look of realization that he may never have the connection with Veronica that Logan has as she guiltily looks down.

In the Veronica Mars film, it is revealed that Piz and Veronica broke up after she transferred to Stanford after her freshman year, but they reconnect when she moves to New York for law school. They are dating at the beginning of the film, but he breaks up with her when her hesitancy to leave Neptune (and Logan) and return to New York make him doubt her feelings for him.

Reception 

AOL included her in its list of TV's Smartest Detectives. The same website named her the 8th Most Memorable Female TV Character. She was featured in UGO.com's 50 Top TV Characters, ranked at No. 17. She was ranked No. 14 in AfterEllen.com's Top 50 Favorite Female TV Characters.

Many have remarked that Bell's performance in the series was overlooked and deserved an Emmy nomination and win.

References

External links 
 Veronica Mars: The Complete First Season, Warner Home Video, 2005, UPC 01256972774.
 Official character MySpace

Veronica Mars characters
Fictional characters from California
Television characters introduced in 2004
Fictional private investigators
Teenage characters in television
American female characters in television
Fictional victims of sexual assault